Pinnacle Rock, is a celebrated volcanic plug on Bartolomé Island, one of Ecuador's Galápagos Islands.  It is in Sullivan Bay, part of a channel that separates Bartolomé from nearby Santiago Island.  The rock is part of a now largely eroded volcanic dike that once connected the two islands.

The rock is the site of ramalima lichen.

Travel writers describe the rock as one of the most spectacular views in the Islands.  A colony of penguins makes its home at the foot of the rock.  Tourists dive in scenic reefs offshore of the rock.

References

Galápagos Islands